Nanshi is a railway station on the Taiwan Railways Administration West Coast line (Mountain line) located in Miaoli City, Miaoli County, Taiwan.

History
The station was opened on 1 July 1903.

Around the station
 National United University
 Wu Chuo-liu Art and Cultural Hall

See also
 List of railway stations in Taiwan

1903 establishments in Taiwan
Miaoli City
Railway stations in Miaoli County
Railway stations opened in 1903
Railway stations served by Taiwan Railways Administration